The 1966–67 Princeton Tigers men's basketball team represented Princeton University in intercollegiate college basketball during the 1966–67 NCAA University Division men's basketball season. Butch van Breda Kolff served as head coach and the team captain was Ed Hummer.  The team played its home games in the Dillon Gymnasium on the University campus in Princeton, New Jersey.  The team was the champion of the Ivy League, which earned them an invitation to the 23-team 1967 NCAA Division I men's basketball tournament.  This was van Breda Kolff's final year as head coach at Princeton. Upon his retirement to go coach the Los Angeles Lakers, he eclipsed R. B. Smith's fifty-eight-year-old Ivy League winning percentage record with a 76.9% mark (103–31).  The record stood until Bill Carmody stepped down in 2000.  His team's helped Princeton end the decade with a 72.6 winning percentage (188–71), which was the tenth best in the nation.

The team posted a 25–3 overall record and a 13–1 conference record. The team earned national ranking following its January 2, 1967 91–81 victory over number three ranked North Carolina Tar Heels at Chapel Hill, North Carolina. The team's January 14, 1967 116–42 victory over  established the Ivy League record for margin of victory. The 116 points continues to be the Ivy League record for points scored in a conference game. During the season, the team spent nine weeks of the fifteen-week season ranked in the Associated Press Top Ten Poll, peaking at number three and ending the season ranked number five.  The team also finished the season ranked number five in the final UPI Coaches' Poll.  Point guard Gary Walters and center Chris Thomforde were featured on the cover of the February 27, 1967, issue of Sports Illustrated.

Then on March 17 in the second round it lost its rematch against a North Carolina team that was ranked in the top 10 all season (no lower than fifth after the third week of the season) by a 78–70 margin in overtime at Cole Field House in College Park, Maryland, before winning the regional consolation game against  78–70 the next night.

Three of the five members of the All-Ivy League first team were Princeton players: Joe Heiser, Chris Thomforde and Gary Walters.  This was the first time that one team had three first team selections.  However, none of the three All-Ivy Princeton players were among the league's top five scorers.  Nonetheless, Thomforde was a second team All-American selection by Converse.  Walters was named first team U.P.I. "Small All-American;" "Honorable Mention All-America" by the A.P.; and was the winner of the B.F. Bunn Trophy, which is "awarded to that member of the varsity basketball team who through sportsmanship, play, and influence has contributed the most to the sport at Princeton." Following the season, Hummer was selected in the 1967 NBA Draft by the Boston Celtics with the 64th overall selection in the 6th round.

Regular season
The team posted a 25-3 (13-1 Ivy League) record.

! = at Charlotte, N.C.
@ = Quaker City Tournament at Philadelphia
 # = NCAA first round at Blacksburg, Va.
$ = NCAA East Regional at College Park, Md.

Home games in CAPS

Rankings

NCAA tournament
The team played in the 1967 NCAA Division I men's basketball tournament.

3/11/67 in Blacksburg, Va.: Princeton 68, West Virginia 57
3/17/67 in College Park, Md.: North Carolina 78, Princeton 70 (OT)
3/18/67 in College Park, Md.: Princeton 78, St. John’s 58

Awards and honors
 Joe Heiser
First Team All-Ivy League
All-East
 Chris Thomforde
First Team All-Ivy League
 Gary Walters
First Team All-Ivy League
First Team U.P.I. "Small All-American"
Honorable Mention A.P. All-America
B.F. Bunn Trophy Winner "awarded to that member of the varsity basketball team who though sportsmanship, play, and influence has contributed the most to the sport at Princeton."
 John Haarlow
Second Team All-Ivy League
 Ed Hummer
Honorable Mention All-Ivy League

Team players drafted into the NBA
Four players from this team were selected in the NBA Draft.

References

Princeton Tigers men's basketball seasons
Princeton
Princeton
Princeton Tigers
Princeton Tigers